Nicolaas Stephanus Erasmus 'Niek' Bezuidenhout  (born 4 August 1950) is a former South African rugby union player.

Playing career
In 1972, he toured with the South African Gazelles, a South African under-24 team, to Argentina.

Bezuidenhout made his test debut in 1972 at Ellis Park against the touring English side captained by John Pullin. During 1974, he played in three tests against the British Lions and two tests during South Africa's tour of France. Bezuidenhout played a further two tests against  and his final test was in 1977 against the World XV. Bezuidenhout played nine test matches and four tour matches for the Springboks.

Test history

See also
List of South Africa national rugby union players – Springbok no. 457

References

1950 births
Living people
South African rugby union players
South Africa international rugby union players
Blue Bulls players
People from Victor Khanye Local Municipality
Rugby union players from Mpumalanga
Rugby union props